Saint-Michel is a village in the Kouka Department of Banwa Province in western Burkina Faso. As of 2005 it had a population of 667.

References

Populated places in the Boucle du Mouhoun Region
Banwa Province